The Cycling Proficiency Test was a test given by Royal Society for the Prevention of Accidents which served as a minimum recommended standard for cycling on British roads. It was superseded by the National Standards for Cycle Training, branded Bikeability, in England in 2007.

Introduction of the test
The first Cycling Proficiency Test was held for seven children on 7 October 1947. The National Cycling Proficiency Scheme was introduced by the Government in 1958, with statutory responsibility for road safety being given to local authorities in 1974, including the provision of child cyclist training.

References

External links
 http://www.bikeability.org.uk
 http://www.cyclingengland.co.uk
 http://www.cyclingscotland.org
 http://www.ctc.org.uk/DesktopDefault.aspx?TabID=3529
 https://web.archive.org/web/20090920112349/http://www.rospa.com/roadsafety/info/cyclist_training_effectiveness.pdf
 http://www.cyclecraft.co.uk/digest/nctp.pdf

Cycling in the United Kingdom
Road safety in the United Kingdom
Child safety
Road safety
Cycling safety
1947 introductions